Macalla finstanalis is a species of snout moth in the genus Macalla. It was described by Schaus in 1922. It is found in Guatemala and Peru.

References

Moths described in 1922
Epipaschiinae